Hemibagrus variegatus is a species of bagrid catfish found in Myanmar known only from the Tenasserim river drainage in the south.

References

Bagridae
Fish of Asia
Fish of Myanmar
Taxa named by Heok Hee Ng
Taxa named by Carl J. Ferraris Jr.
Fish described in 2000